Bui (Builand) is a department of Northwest Province in Cameroon. The department covers an area of 2,297 km and as of 2001 had a total population of 322,877. The capital of the department lies at Kumbo.

Subdivisions
The department is divided administratively into 7 communes and in turn into villages. Greater Kumbo is further divided into 2 subdistricts, Kumbo Urban and Kumbo Rural

Communes 
 Elak-Oku
 Jakiri
  Greater Kumbo
 Mbiame
 Nkum
 Noni
  Mfumuland

See also
Communes of Cameroon

References

Departments of Cameroon
Northwest Region (Cameroon)